Jessica Gordon Nembhard (born July 3, 1956) is an American political economist. She has published books and articles in major economics journals. She is currently Professor of Community Justice and Social Economic Development in the Department of Africana Studies at John Jay College, City University of NY.

Gordon Nembhard was inducted into the U.S. Cooperative Hall of Fame in May, 2016.

Gordon Nembhard's work has covered a variety of topics, including:

 Community-based economic development
 Alternative urban development strategies
 Cooperative economics and worker ownership
 Racial and economic inequality
 Wealth inequality
 Credit unions
 Popular economic literacy
 Community-based asset building
 Community-based approaches to justice

Collective Courage 
In May 2014, Gordon Nembhard's Collective Courage: A History of African American Cooperative Economic Thought and Practice was published, aimed at chronicling African American cooperative business ownership and its role in the social movements for civil rights and economic equality. A study of African American history organizing various forms of cooperatives, "Collective Courage" adds the details of cooperative economic behavior to African-American history resulting in an increased understanding of African American collective economic history and offers guidance for grassroots economic organizing.

Selected publications

Books 
 2014. Collective Courage:  A History of African American Cooperative Economic Thought and Practice. Pennsylvania State University Press. Description & TOC and preview.
 1996. Capital Control, Financial Regulation, and Industrial Policy in South Korea and Brazil. Praeger Publishers.  Description and chapter-preview links.

Articles 
 2014. "Community-based Asset Building and Community Wealth."  Review of Black Political Economy 41, pp. 101–117. https://doi.org/10.1007/s12114-014-9184-z
 2013. “Community Development Credit Unions: Securing and Protecting Assets in Black Communities.” Review of Black Political Economy  40, pp. 459–490. https://doi.org/10.1007%2Fs12114-013-9166-6
 2012.  “Wealth Affirming Policies for Women of Color.” (with Kris Marsh) Review of Black Political Economy special issue “The Invisible Woman”  Vol. 39, pp. 353–360.
 2011. "Worker Cooperatives and the Solidarity Economy Movement."  (with Emily Kawano) Luxemburg Journal, #3, pp. 14–31.
 2008. "Alternative Economics, a Missing Component in the African American Studies Curriculum: Teaching Public Policy and Democratic Community Economics to Black Students." In “Special Issue: Black Political Economy in the 21st Century:  Exploring the Interface of Economics and Black Studies.” Journal of Black Studies Vol. 38  No. 5,   pp. 758–782.
 2006. “Principles and Strategies for Reconstruction: Models of African American Community-Based Cooperative Economic Development.” Harvard Journal of African American Public Policy Vol. 12, pp. 39–55.
 2004a. “Non-Traditional Analyses of Cooperative Economic Impacts: Preliminary Indicators and a Case Study.” Review of International Co-operation Vol. 97, No. 1 (2004), pp. 6–21.
 2004b. “Cooperative Ownership and the Struggle for African American Economic Empowerment.” Humanity & Society Vol. 28, No. 3, 298-321.
 2002a. “Cooperatives and Wealth Accumulation: Preliminary Analysis.” American Economic Review Vol. 92, No.2, pp. 325–329.
 2002b. “Rhonda M. Williams: Competition, Race, Agency and Community.”  “Special Issue: Tribute to Rhonda M. Williams.” (with Gary Dymski) Review of Black Political Economy Vol. 29, No.4, pp. 25–42.
 2000a. “Racial and Ethnic Economic Inequality: The International Record.” (with William Darity) American Economic Review Vol. 90, No. 2, pp. 308–311.
 2000b.  “Democratic Economic Participation and Humane Urban Redevelopment.” Trotter Review, pp. 26–31.
 1999. "Cooperative Economics -- A Community Revitalization Strategy." (with Curtis Haynes, Jr.)  Review of Black Political Economy, Vol. 27, No. 1, pp. 47–71.
 1994. "Social Science Literature Concerning African American Men." (with Edmund T. Gordon and Edmund W. Gordon) The Journal of Negro Education, Vol. 63, No. 4, pp. 508–531.
 1983. "Influence of Parent Practices Upon the Reading Achievement of Good and Poor Readers." (with P.H. Shields and D. Dupree) The Journal of Negro Education, Vol. 52, No. 4, pp. 436–445.

References

External links 
 John Jay College of Criminal Justice Faculty Page
 Jessica Gordon Nembhard at Chicago Freedom Summer speakers
 Interview with Jessica Gordon Nembhard at Grassroots Economic Organizing
 RIPESS video interview

Political economists
American women economists
John Jay College of Criminal Justice faculty
Living people
1956 births
20th-century American economists
21st-century American economists
Women political scientists
20th-century American women
Presidents of the National Economic Association
21st-century American women
American cooperative organizers